Shin Myat Hla may refer to:

 Shin Myat Hla of Prome, early 14th century Duchess of Thayet
 Shin Myat Hla of Ava, Queen of Ava (r. 1426–39)
 Shin Myat Hla of Pakhan, Duchess of Pakhan (r. 1426–34)